PB-38 Quetta-II is a constituency of the Provincial Assembly of Balochistan.

General elections 2013

General elections 2008

See also

 PB-37 Quetta-I
 PB-39 Quetta-III

References

External links
 Election commission Pakistan's official website
 Awazoday.com check result
 Balochistan's Assembly official site

Constituencies of Balochistan